We All Bleed is the third studio album by American rock band Crossfade. It was released on June 21, 2011 – the band's first album in five years as well as their first album since signing with Eleven Seven Music.

Background
In 2008, after being cut from Columbia Records, lead singer Ed Sloan admitted that he fell into a depression of sorts and began to feel disillusioned with the music industry. He admits "Coming from the success of the first record and losing our way after the second album hit me hard. You get signed, everything is golden and you think it’ll go on forever. After we were dropped, I was consumed with self-doubt. Music had always been my escape, but then music became my enemy. I shut down as a songwriter—and actually, pretty much as a human being."

Lead guitarist and keyboardist Les Hall is credited with rejuvenating Sloan's musical interest and masterminding the recording of We All Bleed. Ed Sloan says that his exile had taken him to a darker place in life and that the songs in We All Bleed would reflect that. Though dealing with harsh realities the band also stated that there is a strong element of positivity in the album that 'gets you ready to face the day'. Sloan and Hall maintain that cutting the ties associated with a major label also helped to charter that new path. "It was a fresh start. We spent two years writing whatever we wanted, with no expectations, no deadline," Sloan says. "Who knew if we would even release another record? It was a blast to have no obligation to copy the past."

Critical reception
We All Bleed has received a significantly better critical response compared to Crossfade's first two albums. William Rulhmann from Allmusic gave the album an average 3 out of 5 stars saying "Five years after the disappointing sophomore album Falling Away, Crossfade return on We All Bleed as a somewhat reconstituted outfit."  The album received a review from SputnikMusic that scored the album a three and a half out of five.  The review said " It is not the album that will revitalize modern radio rock, and chances are Crossfade isn’t even the band that will eventually accomplish that deed; but it is a positive step for the entire genre, and it also has the potential to revive the musical careers of Crossfade’s members. We All Bleed is truly a brand of radio rock that you won’t feel guilty for sinking your teeth into."

Track listing

Personnel 
Crossfade
 Ed Sloan – lead vocals, rhythm guitar
 Les Hall – lead guitar, keyboards, background vocals, sampling, string arrangements 
 Mitchell James – bass, background vocals

Additional personnel 
 Will Hunt – drums, percussion
 Ted Jenson – master
 Ben Grosse – mixer
 Jose Alcantar – additional editing
 Paul Pacae – mix assistant, editing, additional engineering 
 Mikey Cavernta – mix assistant, editing, additional engineering 
 Nami Parker – assistant 
 Nick Beats – additional guitar and bass
 Ken Lamper – additional guitar and bass
 Travis Ruff – drums, piano
 Jay Clifford – string arrangements 
 Dan Rockett – additional engineering 
 Brian Conner – background vocals 
 Eddie Burnell – string conductor 
 Justin Drums – violin 1
 Karen Wagner – violin 2
 Catherine Lynn – viola
 Daniel Lawler – cello
 Chuck Wiggins – guitar Tech
 Ki Arons – artwork and photography

Chart performance

Singles
On June 1, 2010 the music video for the first single "Killing Me Inside" was released. The single was released to iTunes and Amazon.com on April 5, 2011. It peaked at No. 16 on the Active Rock chart and at No. 17 on the Mainstream Rock chart. "Prove You Wrong" was released as the second single, while "Dear Cocaine" was released as the third single. "We All Bleed" was released as a fourth and final single. Music videos were created for all three singles.

References

2011 albums
Crossfade (band) albums
Eleven Seven Label Group albums